Eudasyphora cordilleriana is a species of fly.

Distribution
British Columbia to Saskatchewan, south to Oregon and Wyoming.

References

Muscidae
Diptera of North America
Insects described in 1980